Montmorency (also known as Montmorency—Orléans, Beauport—Montmorency—Orléans, and Beauport—Montmorency—Côte-de-Beaupré—Île-d'Orléans) was a federal electoral district in the province of Quebec, Canada, that was represented in the House of Commons of Canada from 1867 to 1917, and from 1968 to 2004.

History

"Montmorency" riding was created by the British North America Act of 1867, and was abolished in 1914 when it was redistributed into Charlevoix—Montmorency and Quebec County ridings.

The riding was recreated in 1966 from parts of Charlevoix and Québec—Montmorency.

It was defined in 1966 to consist of:
 the cities of Beauport, Charlesbourg and Giffard;
 the Towns of Beaupré, Courville, Montmorency, Orsainville and Villeneuve;
 the County of Montmorency No. 2 (Island of Orléans);
 in the County of Montmorency No. 1: the village municipalities of Sainte-Anne-de-Beaupré and Saint-Jean-de-Boischatel; the parish municipalities of Château-Richer, L'Ange-Gardien, Sainte-Anne-de-Beaupré, Sainte-Brigitte-de-Laval and Saint-Joachim; the territory without local municipal organization situated northwest of the parish municipalities of Château-Richer, Sainte-Anne-de-Beaupré, Saint-Féréol, the municipality of Saint-Tite-des-Caps and the Town of Beaupré;
 in the County of Québec: the municipalities of Beauport West, Charlesbourg East and Sainte-Thérèse-de-Lisieux.

In 1976, it was redefined to consist of:
 the City of Giffard;
 the Towns of Beaupré, Château-Richer, Courville, Montmorency, Sainte-Anne-de-Beaupré and Villeneuve;
 the County of Montmorency No. 2;
 in the County of Montmorency No. 1: the village municipality of Saint-Jean-de-Boischatel; the parish municipalities of L'Ange-Gardien, Sainte-Brigitte-de-Laval and Saint-Joachim; the territory without local municipal organization situated northwest of the Towns of Château-Richer and Sainte-Anne-de-Beaupré, of the municipality of Saint-Féréol-les-Neiges and of Sainte-Anne-du-Nord River, southeast of the easterly prolongation of the southern limit of the Township of Lescarbot;
 in the County of Québec: the parish municipality of Saint-Michel-Archange and the municipality of Sainte-Thérèse-de-Lisieux.

In 1980, it was renamed "Montmorency—Orléans".

In 1987, it was redefined to consist of the towns of Beauport, Beaupré, Château-Richer and Sainte-Anne-de-Beaupré; the County of Montmorency No. 2; and the County of Montmorency No. 1 excluding the Territory of Montmorency No. 1-Lac-Moncouche portion.

In 1990, it was renamed "Beauport—Montmorency—Orléans".

In 1996, the riding was changed to consist of the cities of Beauport, Beaupré, Château-Richer and Sainte-Anne-de-Beaupré; the County Regional Municipality of L'Île-d'Orléans; and the County Regional Municipality of La Côte-de-Beaupré, excluding the unorganized territory of Lac-Jacques-Cartier.

In 1998, it was renamed "Beauport—Montmorency—Côte-de-Beaupré—Île-d'Orléans".

In 2003, it was abolished when it was redistributed into Beauport and Charlevoix—Montmorency ridings.

Members of Parliament

This riding elected the following Members of Parliament:

Election results

Montmorency (1867–1917)

By-election: On Mr. Cauchon being called to the Senate, 2 November 1867

By-election: On Mr. Valin being unseated on petition, 14 January 1880

By-election: On Mr. Angers being appointed Puisne Judge, Superior Court of Quebec, 13 November 1880

By-election: On Mr. Langelier's resignation, 10 June 1890

By-election: On election being declared void

Montmorency (1966–1980)

Montmorency—Orléans (1981–1990)

Beauport—Montmorency—Orléans (1990–1998)

|-

|-

Beauport—Montmorency—Côte-de-Beaupré—Île-d'Orléans (1998–2003)

See also 

 List of Canadian federal electoral districts
 Past Canadian electoral districts

External links

Riding history from the Library of Parliament:
Montmorency (1867 - 1914)
Montmorency (1966 - 1980)
Montmorency--Orléans (1981 - 1990)
Beauport--Montmorency--Orléans (1990 - 1998)
Beauport--Montmorency--Côte-de-Beaupré--Île-d'Orléans(1998 - 2003)

Former federal electoral districts of Quebec